Jennifer Ratner-Rosenhagen is a history professor at the University of Wisconsin–Madison and the author of American Nietzsche (2011). She was a Radcliffe Institute Fellow in 2014–2015.

Education
2003: Ph.D. in History of American Civilization, Brandeis University, Waltham, Massachusetts
1992: B.A. in History, University of Rochester, Rochester, New York.

Works

References

External links 

 

Living people
Brandeis University alumni
University of Rochester alumni
University of Wisconsin–Madison faculty
Intellectual historians
Year of birth missing (living people)